National Secondary Route 234, or just Route 234 (or ) is a National Road Route of Costa Rica, located in the Limón province.

Description
In Limón province the route covers Limón canton (Valle La Estrella district).

References

Highways in Costa Rica